Charles Henry Wingender (September 20, 1884 – April 19, 1943) was an American football and basketball coach and a lawyer. He was the head football coach at the University of Denver in 1913, tallying a mark of 2–5. Wingender was served three stints as Denver's head basketball coach, in 1910–11, from 1914 to 1916, and in 1918–19, compiling a record of 24–13. He was a graduate of Lawrence University in Appleton, Wisconsin.

Head coaching record

Football

References

External links
 

1884 births
1943 deaths
Denver Pioneers football coaches
Denver Pioneers men's basketball coaches
Lawrence Vikings football players
People from Mineral Point, Wisconsin
Coaches of American football from Wisconsin
Players of American football from Wisconsin
Basketball coaches from Wisconsin